Ang Pinaka is a Philippine television informative show broadcast by GMA News TV. Originally hosted by Pia Guanio, it premiered on November 13, 2005 on Q. The show moved to GMA News TV on March 6, 2011. The show concluded on March 15, 2020. Rovilson Fernandez served as the final host.

Cast
Hosts
 Pia Guanio 
 Rovilson Fernandez 

Featuring
 Betong Sumaya
 Maey Bautista

Production
The production was halted in March 2020 due to the enhanced community quarantine in Luzon caused by the COVID-19 pandemic.

Accolades

References

External links
 
 

2005 Philippine television series debuts
2020 Philippine television series endings
Filipino-language television shows
GMA Integrated News and Public Affairs shows
GMA News TV original programming
Philippine documentary television series
Q (TV network) original programming
Television productions cancelled due to the COVID-19 pandemic